Léo Trespeuch, was born on 4 April 1987. He lives in Val Thorens. He has practiced snowboarding since 1997. On the 26 January 2007, he became the Boardercross University World Champion. He studied at University of Savoy and University of Grenoble. He researches into sports marketing, including Sponsoring, Crowdfunding and Participation.

References

External links
 
 FIS Results

1987 births
French male snowboarders
Université Savoie-Mont Blanc alumni
Living people
Universiade medalists in snowboarding
Universiade bronze medalists for France
Competitors at the 2007 Winter Universiade
Competitors at the 2013 Winter Universiade
21st-century French people